West of Broadway is a 1931 American pre-Code drama film directed by Harry Beaumont and written by Ralph Graves, Bess Meredyth, Gene Markey, and James Kevin McGuinness. The film stars John Gilbert, El Brendel, Lois Moran, Madge Evans and Ralph Bellamy. The film was released on November 28, 1931, by Metro-Goldwyn-Mayer.

Plot
Jerry Stevens is a Chicago millionaire whose fiancee Anne falls for another man while Jerry's off to war. Jerry ends up escorting two young ladies, roommates Dot and Maizie, to a party, and when Anne turns up there with her new lover, a jealous Jerry lies and introduces Dot as his new love.

Dot goes along with the gag and has been kind to Jerry all evening, so much so that, after having too many drinks, he proposes marriage to Dot and takes her to a justice of the peace. He wakes up having little or no recollection of what occurred. Recognizing that he has a drinking problem, Dot becomes determined to help Jerry regain sobriety.

Annoyed that she won't grant a divorce, Jerry leaves for a ranch he owns in Arizona, only to find Dot there waiting for him. She doesn't fall for his fib that he is ill and has six months to live. But when he goes to greater lengths to get rid of her, Dot gives up and goes back home, declining his offer of $10,000. Anne is available again, but it gradually dawns on Jerry that the woman he really loves is Dot.

Cast
John Gilbert as Jerry Stevens 
El Brendel as Axel 'Swede' Axelson
Lois Moran as Dot Stevens
Madge Evans as Anne
Ralph Bellamy as Mac 
Frank Conroy as Judge Barham
Gwen Lee as Maizie
Hedda Hopper as Mrs. Edith Trent
Willie Fung as Wing 
John Miljan as Norm

References

External links 
 

1931 films
American drama films
1931 drama films
Metro-Goldwyn-Mayer films
Films directed by Harry Beaumont
American black-and-white films
1930s English-language films
1930s American films